Rhamphocottus nagaakii is a species of marine ray-finned fish belonging to the family Rhamphocottidae, the grunt sculpins. This species was first formally described in 2022 with its type locality given as off Minami-Sanriku cho in Miyagi Prefecture of Japan. It is  thought to have evolved from a common ancestor to the grunt sculpin (Rhamphocottus richardsonii) but the two species were thought to have been separated by a cooling event during either the Pliocene or Miocene. This species differs from the grunt sculpin genetically and morphologically. The specific name honours Nagaaki Satoh, a professional diving instructor, who was the first to observe the reproductive behaviour of R. nagaakii  and passed these observations to the species' describers.

References

nagaakii
Fish described in 2022